Fredy Rolando Otárola Peñaranda (born 5 May 1961) is a Peruvian lawyer, notary and politician (PNP). He was a former Congressman representing the Ancash Region between 2006 and 2016. He served as Minister of Labor and Employment from 2014 to 2015 and briefly as Minister of Justice in 2015 during the administration of Ollanta Humala.

Early life, education and career 
He was born in the city of Huaraz where he continued his primary studies at the Antonio Raimondi and Jorge Basadre schools; and the secondary ones, in the Mariscal Luzuriaga of the same city. He graduated as a lawyer from the Universidad de San Martín de Porres in Lima in 1986 and later specialized in Commercial Civil Law at the Universidad de San Martín de Porres in Lima. From 1991 to 1993, he was head of the office of public records of Ancash Region. From 1998 to 2006, he practised as a notary.

Political career

Early political career 
In the 1998 municipal elections, he ran for District Mayor of Huaraz, but he was not elected, placing fourth.

Congressman 
Eight years later, after his failed bid for the District Mayoralty of Huaraz, in the 2006 elections, he ran for Congress, and was elected on the joint Union for Peru-Peruvian Nationalist Party ticket, representing the Ancash Region. After the alliance split, Otárola sat in the Nationalist bench in Congress. From 2008 to 2009, he was the national spokesman of the Peruvian Nationalist Party. In the 2011 elections, he was reelected for another five-year term, this time on the Nationalists-dominated Peru Wins list.

President of the Congress
In 2013, Otárola was elected President of the Congress for the annual legislative term 2013–2014. During his tenure, Congress finally renewed the Constitutional Tribunal and the Board of the Directors of the Central Reserve Bank of Peru. His term ended on 22 July 2014, in which, he was appointed Minister of Labor by President Ollanta Humala.

Minister of Labor
President Ollanta Humala appointed Otárola as Minister of Labor on 22 July 2014, replacing Ana Jara, who was appointed Prime Minister of Peru. He was replaced in the Presidency of the Congress by Second Vice President Luis Iberico Núñez for just a few days until the new election for President of Congress for the 2014–2015 term. His term ended on 17 February 2015, where he was transferred to head the Ministry of Justice.

Minister of Justice 
In February 2015, he was transferred to the Ministry of Justice and briefly served as Minister of Justice until April 2015, when Ana Jara was censured by Congress.

Controversies 
In June 2015, Otárola was assaulted by a taxi driver.

References

External links
 Official Congressional site (2006-2011 term)
 Congressional site (2011-2016 term)
 Resume on the National Jury of Elections (JNE) site

Living people
1961 births
21st-century Peruvian politicians
Peruvian Nationalist Party politicians
Members of the Congress of the Republic of Peru
Presidents of the Congress of the Republic of Peru
Peruvian Ministers of Justice
University of San Martín de Porres alumni
People from Ancash Region